Arrival is a 2016 American science fiction film directed by Denis Villeneuve and written by Eric Heisserer. Starring Amy Adams, Jeremy Renner and Forest Whitaker, the film focuses on the contact between the linguist and aliens in one of 12 extraterrestrial spacecraft which appeared across the Earth. The film had its world premiere at the Venice Film Festival on September 1, 2016 and was released to theaters on November 11, 2016. The film was released to positive reviews, with Rotten Tomatoes aggregating an approval rating of 94%, based on 327 reviews, with an average rating of 8.3/10 and Metacritic giving a score of 81 out of 100, based on 52 reviews.

Arrival won Best Sound Editing and was nominated for Best Picture, Best Director, Best Adapted Screenplay, Best Sound Mixing, Best Cinematography, Best Film Editing and Best Production Design at the Academy Awards. The film won Best Sound and was nominated for Best Film, Best Actress in a Leading Role for Adams, Best Direction, Best Adapted Screenplay, Best Cinematography, Best Editing, Best Film Music and Best Special Visual Effects at British Academy Film Awards. The film won Best Sci-Fi/Horror Movie and Best Adapted Screenplay and was nominated for Best Picture, Best Director, Best Actress for Adams, Best Cinematography, Best Art Direction, Best Editing, Best Visual Effects and Best Score at Critics' Choice Awards. The film received two nominations at Golden Globe Awards, including Best Actress – Motion Picture Drama for Adams and Best Original Score.

Accolades

Notes

References

External links 
 

Lists of accolades by film